Cape Cod Crusaders were an American soccer team based in Buzzards Bay, Massachusetts, United States. Founded in 1994, the team played in the USL Premier Development League (PDL), the fourth tier of the American Soccer Pyramid, until 2008, when the franchise folded and the team left the league.

The team played its home games at several different venues in eastern Massachusetts: mainly in stadium on the campus of the Massachusetts Maritime Academy, but also at Whitman-Hanson High School in Whitman, Massachusetts, and at Bowditch Stadium in Framingham, Massachusetts. Also played at Barnstable High School in the town of Hyannis, Massachusetts. The Crusaders' historical home was the stadium on the grounds Dennis Yarmouth High School in the town of Yarmouth, Massachusetts, where they won back to back championships in 2002 and 2003. The team's colors were red and white.

The team had a sister organization, the Boston Renegades, who play in the women's USL W-League. The club still fields a team in the USL's Super-20 League, a league for players 17 to 20 years of age run under the United Soccer Leagues umbrella.

History

The Crusaders were one of the most successful minor-league soccer teams in the United States, having been national PDL champions twice, in 2002 and 2003. The team was also one of the most long-lasting teams, having played in four different leagues, at two different levels, over the course of more than a decade. In the mid-2000s the Crusaders became part of the Massachusetts Premier Soccer (MPS) organization, which runs soccer schools and north senior and junior amateur leagues across Massachusetts, with the intent of developing and promoting the game.

In 2007, Crusaders striker Ricardo Pierre-Louis was part of the Haiti squad which took part in the 2007 CONCACAF Gold Cup. Pierre-Louis was the only PDL player to take part in the tournament, coming on as a substitute in the 1–1 draw with Costa Rica, and playing a full 90 minutes in the 2–0 defeat to Canada.

Players

Final squad
vs. Brooklyn Knights, 25 July 2008

Year-by-year

Honors
 USL PDL New England Division Champion 2008
 USL PDL Northeast Division Champion 2007
 USL PDL New England Division Champion 2006
 USL PDL Northeast Division Champion 2005
 USL PDL Champion 2003
 USL PDL Eastern Conference Champion 2003
 USL PDL Champion 2002
 USL PDL Eastern Conference Champion 2002

Head coaches
  Methembe Ndlovu (2003)
  Paul Baber (2005–2008)

Stadiums

 Stadium at Dennis Yarmouth High School, South Yarmouth, Massachusetts (1994–2003)
 Stadium at Barnstable High School, Hyannis, Massachusetts (2004–2007)
 Stadium at Nauset Regional High School, North Eastham, Massachusetts 1 game (2005)
 Stadium at Weymouth High School, Weymouth, Massachusetts 1 game (2006)
 Stadium at Whitman-Hanson Regional High School, Whitman, Massachusetts 3 games (2007–2008)
 Stadium at Massachusetts Maritime Academy, Buzzards Bay, Massachusetts (2008)
 Stadium at Bridgewater-Raynham Regional High School, Bridgewater, Massachusetts 1 game (2008)
 Bowditch Stadium, Framingham, Massachusetts 1 game (2008)

Average attendance
2008: 309
2007: 284
2006: 330
2005: 306

References

External links
 Cape Cod Crusaders/Massachusetts Premier Soccer

1994 establishments in Massachusetts
2008 disestablishments in Massachusetts
Association football clubs established in 1994
Association football clubs disestablished in 2008
Bourne, Massachusetts
Defunct Premier Development League teams
Soccer clubs in Massachusetts
Sports in Barnstable County, Massachusetts
USL Second Division teams